Agnieszka Radwańska was the defending champion but did not compete in the Juniors this year.

Caroline Wozniacki defeated Magdaléna Rybáriková in the final, 3–6, 6–1, 6–3 to win the girls' singles tennis title at the 2006 Wimbledon Championships.

Seeds

  Anastasia Pavlyuchenkova (first round)
  Chan Yung-jan (third round)
  Alisa Kleybanova (quarterfinals)
  Caroline Wozniacki (champion)
  Sorana Cîrstea (second round)
  Magdaléna Rybáriková (final)
  Ayumi Morita (quarterfinals)
  Julia Cohen (second round)
  Khrystyna Antoniichuk (third round)
  Tamira Paszek (semifinals)
  Ksenia Milevskaya (first round)
  Teliana Pereira (first round)
  Kateřina Vaňková (first round)
  Marina Erakovic (first round, retired)
  Evgeniya Rodina (third round)
  Alexandra Dulgheru (quarterfinals)

Draw

Finals

Top half

Section 1

Section 2

Bottom half

Section 3

Section 4

References

External links

Girls' Singles
Wimbledon Championship by year – Girls' singles